Lucie Vondráčková (born 8 March 1980 in Prague, Czechoslovakia) is a Czech popular singer and  theatre and film actress. She has won a number of awards, including the Best Actress award at the 2020 Prague Independent Film Festival for her role in Beyond her Lens.

Lucie Vondráčková comes from a musical family. Her father Jiří Vondráček is a musician, while her mother, Hana Sorrosa Vondráčková, is a respected lyricist. She speaks five languages and has Ecuadorian roots via a maternal grandfather.

Vondráčková attended primary school in Prague. She studied music and drama at the Prague Conservatory, and completed the course of Cultural studies, with a Master of Arts degree. She earned the degree of Doctor of Philosophy in 2006 at Charles University in Prague.

On 17 June 2011, she married Czech International hockey player Tomáš Plekanec who played for the Montreal Canadiens and Toronto Maple Leafs in the National Hockey League. The couple has 2 sons, Matyáš and Adam. They divorced in 2019.

Filmography 
Labyrint (2012) .... Renata
"Rodinka" (2010) TV series .... Andula
Country Club: První směna (2009) (video) .... Jana
"Panelák" (2009) TV series .... Petra Pařízková
Bathory (2008) .... Lucia
The Wrong Mr Jonhson (2008) (video) .... Apollonia
"Nemocnice na kraji města - nové osudy" (2008) TV series .... Linda
Setkání v Praze, s vraždou (2008) (TV) .... Věra Hořejší
Kvaska (2007) .... Karin
V hlavní roli (2007) (TV) .... Tereza
Manželé z roku 2006 (2006) (TV) .... Šárka Duspivová
Poslední kouzlo (2006) (TV) .... princess Lída
Last Holiday (2006) .... receptionist Marie
The Fine Art of Love: Mine Ha-Ha (2005) .... Pamela
Nepovedený kouzelník (2005) (TV) .... Jeduna
Umění milovat (2005) (TV)
In nomine patris (2004) (TV) .... Neumann's girlfriend
Křesadlo (2004) (TV) .... princess Astrid
Modrý Mauritius (2004) (TV) .... Božka
Post Coitum (2004) .... Kristýna
Snowboarďáci (2004) .... Klára
Králoství hříchů (2003) (video) .... princess Alana
Malvína (2003) .... fairy Malvína
Báječná show (2002) (voice)
Kožené slunce (2002) (TV) .... Alena Vazačová
Královský slib (2001) .... Dina/page
O víle Arnoštce (2001 (TV) .... Arnoštka
Ta třetí (2001) (TV) .... Adéla
Na zámku (200) (TV) .... Klára
Kouzlený šíp (1998) (TV) .... princess Liliana
Šmankote, babičko, čaruj! (1998) .... Esterka
Nejasná zpráva o konci světa (1997) .... Lucie
Tú žijú levy (1997) (TV)
Hrad z písků (1994) .... daughter
Nebeský pláč (1994) .... Jenna
Ohnivé jaro (1994) .... Laura
Císařovy nové šaty (1993) .... taylor
Jenny Marx, la femme du diable (1993) (TV)
Vikingové z Bronských vršků (1993) (TV) .... Bobena
"Arabela se vrací" (1993) TV series .... little doctor in Pultanela
Sněhurka (1992) (TV)
"Králoství květin" (1991) TV series .... Anna

Supporting roles in TV series 
4teens (2011) playing receptionist Marie in episode: "Lyžák" 2011
Strážce duší (2008) playing Karin in episode: "Neviditelný zabiják" 6 July 2009
3 plus 1 s Miroslavem Donutilem (2008) playing Šárka Viklická in episode: "Otcové a dcery" 5 April 2008
3 plus 1 s Miroslavem Donutilem (2008) playing Helena in episode: "Otcové a synové" 1 October 2008
Hospoda (1996) playing "rebellian student" in episode: "Za školu" 1996
Území bílých králů (1991)

Theatre 

Ať žije rock'n'roll (2008) .... mladá svazačka Yveta, Divadlo Broadway
Touha (2008) .... Karin, Divadlo Kalich (Daniel Landa)
La Douce (2007) .... La Douce, Theatre L´ APOSTROPHE, Scene nationale Cergy-Pontoise –Val d´Oise-Théatre des Arts, Théatre des Louvrais, (Dostoyevskiy)*
Dumb Show (2007) .... journalist Liz, Divadlo Ungelt (Joe Penhall)
Othello (2006) .... Desdemona, Summer Shakespeare Festival, Prague (William Shakespeare)
Brothers Karamazow (2006) .... ???, Divadlo Husa na provázku, Brno (Yekaterina Ivanovna Vrchova)
Tajemství (2005) .... Doctor Eliška, Kalich Theatre (Daniel Landa)
Timberlake Wertenbaker|Pod Jižním křížem (2004) .... Marie, Rokoko Theatre
Excalibur (2003) .... Morgan, Divadlo Ta Fantastika (Michal Pavlíček, Steigerwald, Jan Sahara Hedl
Skřivánek (2002) .... ???, Rokoko Theatre (J. Anouilh)
Hrobka s vyhlídkou (2002) .... Nurse, Rokoko Theatre (Norman Robbins)
Starci na chmelu (2001) .... ???, Divadlo Milénium
Closer (2001) .... ???, Rokoko Theatre (Patrick Marber)
Čarodějky ze Salemu (2000) .... Mary Warren, Rokoko Theatre
Black Comedy (play) (2000) .... ???, Rokoko Theatre (Peter Shaffer)
Richard III (2000) .... ???, Kašpar Theatre Company, Prague
Kašpar (2000) .... Anna / Markéta / písař
The Cherry Orchard (1998) .... Aoa, Theatre Rokoko (Anton Pavlovich Chekhov)
Romeo and Juliet (1997) .... Juliet (William Shakespeare)
The Satin Slipper (1992) .... (by Paul Claudel), National Theatre, Prague

Discography

1990s
 1993 - Marmeláda (Tommü Records)
 1994 - Rok 2060 (Tommü Records)
 1995 - Atlantida (Tommü Records)
 1997 - Malá Mořská Víla (Tommü Records)
 1998 - The Best Of English Version (Tommü Records)

2000s
 2000 - Manon (Tommü Records)
 2003 - Mayday (Tommü Records)
 2005 - Boomerang (Tommü Records)
 2007 - Pel Mel 1993 - 2007 (Universal)
 2008 - Fénix (Tommü Records) 2-CD set

2010s
 2010 - Dárek (Tommü Records)
 2013 - OHEN (BrainZone)

External links

References

1980 births
Living people
21st-century Czech women singers
Czech film actresses
Musicians from Prague
Actresses from Prague
Czech pop singers
Czech people of Ecuadorian descent
20th-century Czech actresses
21st-century Czech actresses
Czech expatriates in Canada
Folk-pop singers
Charles University alumni
20th-century Czech women singers